The Stanford Formation is a geologic formation in England. It preserves fossils dating back to the  Oxfordian stage of the  Middle Jurassic period, around 160 million years ago.

See also

 List of fossiliferous stratigraphic units in England

References
 

Jurassic England
Jurassic System of Europe
Oxfordian Stage